Bonaventura Porta (October 21, 1866 – December 15, 1953) was the Italian Bishop of the Roman Catholic Diocese of Pesaro from his appointment by Pope Benedict XV on March 22, 1917, until December 28, 1952.

He died on December 15, 1953.

Bibliography 
 Dante Simoncelli, Teodoro Briguglio, Mons. Bonaventura Porta vescovo di Pesaro (1917-1953), in Atti delle celebrazioni e del convegno nel cinquantesimo anniversario della morte: Pesaro 13–15 December 2003

References

External links
Profile of Mons. Porta www.catholic-hierarchy.org 
Official Page of diocese of Pesaro

1866 births
Bishops and archbishops of Pesaro
20th-century Italian Roman Catholic bishops
1953 deaths
People from the Province of Rovigo